Schofield Peak is a peak 1 nautical mile (1.9 km) southeast of Mount McCarthy, in the Barker Range, Victoria Land. Mapped by United States Geological Survey (USGS) from surveys and U.S. Navy air photos, 1960–64. Named by Advisory Committee on Antarctic Names (US-ACAN) after Edmund A. Schofield, biologist at Hallett Station, summer 1963–64, and McMurdo Station, 1967–68.

Mountains of Victoria Land
Pennell Coast